The Apco Presta is an Israeli single-place, paraglider that was designed and produced by Apco Aviation of Caesarea. It is now out of production.

Design and development
The Presta was designed as an intermediate glider, to fit in the company's line between the Apco Allegra and the Bagheera, with higher performance than the Allegra. The sail is made from 46gr/m2 "Zero Porosity" ripstop nylon. The design uses an Active Double Valve System to allow closed cells to be easily inflated on launch. The four models are each named for their relative size.

Variants
Presta XS
Extra small-sized model for light pilots. The glider model is AFNOR Standard certified.
Presta S
Small-sized model for lighter pilots. The glider model is DHV 1-2 and AFNOR Standard certified.
Presta M
Mid-sized model for medium-weight pilots. The glider model is DHV 1-2 and AFNOR Standard certified.
Presta L
Large-sized model for heavier pilots. The glider model is DHV 1-2 and AFNOR Standard certified.

Specifications (Presta L)

References

External links

Presta
Paragliders